Freekeh (sometimes spelled frikeh) or farik ( / ALA-LC: farīkah; pronounced free-kah /ˈfɹiːkə/) is a cereal food made from green durum wheat (Triticum turgidum var. durum) that is roasted and rubbed to create its flavour.  It is an ancient dish derived from Levantine and North African cuisines, remaining popular in many countries of the eastern Mediterranean Basin, where durum wheat originated.

The wheat is harvested while the grains are green and the seeds are still soft; it is then piled and sun-dried. The piles are carefully set on fire such that only the straw and chaff burn. Under these conditions, the high moisture content of the seeds prevents them from burning. The roasted wheat is then threshed and sun-dried to achieve a uniform flavour, texture, and colour.  This threshing or rubbing process of the grains gives this food its name, farīk or "rubbed". Finally, the seeds are cracked into smaller pieces that resemble green bulgur.

History
Freekeh is mentioned in an early thirteenth-century Baghdad cookbook as farīkiyya. In that recipe, meat is fried in oil and braised with water, salt, and cinnamon bark. Then, dried coriander is stirred in with young wheat ("freekeh") and is cooked. Finally, the meal is served with cumin, cinnamon, and fresh lamb tail fat.

Freekeh is mentioned in the Hebrew Bible under the term "qalûy" (scorched or roasted) or "carmel" indicating it was used in ancient Israelite cuisine. The Syriac version of the Bible translates the term into froka, an Arabic cognate.

Culinary

In Egypt, freekeh is served as ḥamām bi’l-ferīk (pigeon stuffed with green wheat). Freekeh is also prepared in Egypt with onion and tomato, and sometimes with chicken. Shūrbat farīk bi’l-mukh is a freekeh and bone marrow soup from Tunisia. , a green wheat pilaf dish with roasted lamb, spring peas, and pine nuts, comes from Jordan, and shūrba al-farīk is a Palestinian soup with green wheat and chicken.

In Syria, freekeh usually is prepared with lamb, onion, butter, almonds, black pepper, cinnamon, cumin, and salt. 

In Tunisia and Algeria, freekeh is usually prepared as a main ingredient in a tomato-based soup called chorba't frik, which is considered a traditional national dish.

In Turkey, freekeh is known as firik, and a pilaf dish based on freekeh, called firik pilavı, is found in traditional Southern Anatolian cuisine. It may be combined with bulgur; legumes such as chickpeas and various herbs and spices, and sometimes meat, may be added. With the influx of millions of Syrian refugees since 2011, firik is available in markets all over Turkey.

In Palestine, a variety of freekeh pilaf is made with lamb, onion, olive oil, raisins, dried cherry plums, almonds, pine nuts, black pepper, cinnamon, cumin, and salt. as well as in a soup along with chickpeas and meat (beef or chicken).

Nutritional value

Freekeh is comparable in nutritional content to other cereal grains, especially durum wheat, from which it is derived, depending on the durum cultivar. Durum is notable for its high content of protein (20% or more of the Daily Value, DV), dietary fiber, B vitamins, and several dietary minerals, especially manganese (143% DV) (table). Before roasting, freekeh is 11% water, 71% carbohydrates, 2.5% fat, and 14% protein.

See also
 List of Middle Eastern dishes
 Grünkern, a similar preparation made from spelt
 List of African dishes

References

Arab cuisine
Lebanese cuisine
Levantine cuisine
Jordanian cuisine
Palestinian cuisine
Egyptian cuisine
Syrian cuisine
Israeli cuisine
Turkish cuisine
Algerian cuisine
Tunisian cuisine
North African cuisine
Ancient dishes
Bulgur dishes
Middle Eastern cuisine